Gary Robert Conelly (born October 18, 1952) is an American former swimmer who represented the United States at the 1972 Summer Olympics in Munich, Germany.  Conelly swam for the winning U.S. teams in the preliminary heats of the men's 4×100-meter freestyle relay and 4×200-meter freestyle relay.  Under the 1972 Olympic rules, however, he was ineligible to receive a medal because he did not swim in the final of the relays.

See also
 List of Indiana University (Bloomington) people
 World record progression 4 × 100 metres freestyle relay

References

1952 births
Living people
American male freestyle swimmers
World record setters in swimming
Indiana Hoosiers men's swimmers
Olympic swimmers of the United States
Sportspeople from Denver
Swimmers at the 1972 Summer Olympics